Goephanes cristipennis is a species of beetle in the family Cerambycidae. It was described by Breuning in 1957.

References

Goephanes
Beetles described in 1957
Taxa named by Stephan von Breuning (entomologist)